Kojom gorom is the fourteenth studio album by Serbian singer Dragana Mirković. It was released in 1997.

Track listing
Kojom gorom
Poslednje veče
Biće mi kako kad
Ko je da je
Bolna sam ti
O na, na, na
Neću pokajanje
Niko nikog ne voli
Svetinja
Dolina kestenova
Samo da te vidim
Hajde pogledaj me

References

1997 albums
Dragana Mirković albums